Autant en emporte le vent is a French musical adaptation of the 1936 Margaret Mitchell novel Gone with the Wind produced by Dove Attia and Albert Cohen in 2003, with music and lyrics by Gérard Presgurvic and staging and choreography by Kamel Ouali.

The debut performance was at Palais des Sports de Paris on 30 September 2003. After three months daily performances in Paris, the show moved to tour other major cities in France, Belgium, and Switzerland. The final show was in Nîmes arena on 11 July 2004.

Personnel
Production: Dove Attia and Albert Cohen
Vocal direction: Richard Cross assisted by Nathalie Dupuis
Staging and choreography: Kamel Ouali
Gérard Presgurvic – Music, lyrics, narrator

Singers
Laura Presgurvic – Scarlett O'Hara
Vincent Niclo – Rhett Butler
Sophie Delmas – Belle Watling
Arié Itah – Gérald O'Hara
Sandra Léane – Mélanie Hamilton Wiles
Dominique Magloire – Mama
Cyril Niccolaï – Ashley Wilkes
Joël O'Cangha – Le chef des esclaves

Dancers / actors
Georgette Kala Lobé – Prissy
Marjorie Hannoteau – Ellen Robillard O'Hara, mother of Scarlett, Suellen and Carreen
Delphine Attal – Suellen O'Hara, first sister of Scarlett and Bonnie Blue
Hélène Buannic – Carreen O'Hara, second sister of Scarlett
France Hervé – India Wilkes (in Paris productions) 
Marjorie Ascione – India Wilkes (during tour in other venues)
Valentin Vossenat – Charles Hamilton, first husband of Scarlett
David Decarme – Frank Kennedy, second husband of Scarlett (in Paris productions)
Allal Mouradoudi – Frank Kennedy,  second husband of Scarlett  (during tour in other venues)
Massimiliano Belsito – prison guard
Philippe Mésia – prison guard

Alternative actors
Virginie Duez – Scarlett O'Hara
Jerome Rouzier – Rhett Buttler and Ashley Wilkes
Marie Angèle Yoldi – Mama
Didier Ayat – Gerald O'Hara
Claire Cappelletti – Mélanie Hamilton Wilkes
Lydia Dejugnac – Belle Watling
Marc Beaujour – Chief of the slaves
Cathy Ematchoua – Prissy
Béatrice Buffin – Ellen Robillard O'Hara
Alexandra Lemoine – Suellen O'Hara
Jessica Sakalof – Careen O'Hara
Jérôme Couchart – Charles Hamilton

Dancers
Professional dancers: Marjorie Ascione, Delphine Attal, Massimilio Belsito, Hacine Brahimi, Hélène Buannic, Béatrice Buffin, Emilie Capel, Jérôme Couchart, David Decarme, Fabien Hannot, Marjorie Hannoteaux, France Hervé, Georgette Louison Kala Lobe, Malik Lenost, Joakim Lorca, Philipe Mésia, Laurence Perez, Carl Portal, Sébastion Fjedj, Salem Sohibi et Valentin Vossenat.

Training dancers: Carlos Da Silva, Caty Ematchoua, Khalid Ghajji, Djad Hassane, Oswald Jean, Nestor Kouame, Fabrice Labrana, Alexandra Lemoine, Alexandre Martin, Mélanie Moniez, Catia Mota Da Cruz, Allal Mouradoudi, Jessica Sakalof, Sonia Tajouri et Nadine Timas.

Voices
Isabelle Ferron – voice of Ketty Scarlett
Frederic Charter – voice of a Yankee
Tom Ross – voice of a Southerner
Gérard Presgurvic – Narrator

Songs

"Le bien contre le mal" – by the Yankees and the Southerners
"Seule" – by Scarlett O'Hara
"Bonbon rose" – by Mélanie Hamilton and Ashley Wilkes
"Nous ne sommes pas" – by Scarlett O'Hara
"Lâche" – by Rhett Butler and Gérald O'Hara
"Gâtée" – by Ashley Wilkes
"Ma terre" – by Gérald O'Hara
"Être noir" – by the Chief of the Slaves and by Mama
"Vous dites" – by Scarlett O'Hara and Rhett Butler
"Elle" – by Rhett Butler
"Si ce vent m'emporte" – by Mélanie Hamilton
"Putain" – by Belle Watling
"Je rentre maman" – by Scarlett O'Hara
"Je jure" – by Scarlett O'Hara
"J'ai tous perdu" – by Gérald O'Hara
"Tous les hommes" – by Chief of the Slaves
"Scarlett" – by Ashley Wilkes
"Ma vie coule" – by Scarlett O'Hara
"Mentir" – by Rhett Butler
"Marions nous" – by Belle Watling
"Que savez-vous de l'amour" – by Scarlett O'Hara and Mélanie Hamilton
"Que veulent les femmes" – by Rhett Butler
"Mélopée" – by Mama
"Morte" – by Ashley Wilkes
"Je vous aimais" – by Rhett Butler and Scarlett O'Hara
"Sourd" – by Mama, Rhett Butler, Scarlett O'Hara and the group
"Libres" – by Scarlett O'Hara, Rhett Butler and the group

Album
The album contains the following tracks:
"Le bien contre le mal"
"Libres"
"Elle"
"Être Noir"
"Si le vent m'emporte"
"Seule"
"Ma terre"
"Tous les hommes"
"Scarlett O'Hara"
"Putain"
"Ma vie coule" 
"Nous ne sommes pas"

Singles
"Tous les hommes"
"Libres"
"Ma vie coule"
"Nous ne sommes pas"
"Être Noir"

2003 musicals
Works based on Gone with the Wind
Musicals based on novels
French musicals
Plays set in Georgia (U.S. state)
Plays set in the 19th century